Live: Sacred and Profane is a live album from American new wave band Berlin, released in 2000 by Time Bomb Recordings. The band's first live album, it features twelve live tracks and three new studio tracks. The live tracks were recorded at the Coach House, San Juan Capistrano, California on December 4, 1999.

Critical reception

Upon release, Ben Varkentine of PopMatters said: "If you like these songs you're better off seeking out a greatest hits collection; as the new, increased guitar arrangements don't add anything particularly memorable to the old songs." Doug Stone of AllMusic commented that the album "holds more guts than expected considering the vast keyboard capacity of Terri Nunn's vehicle" and the "melodies remain sharp, haunting, and hot". He concluded: "Live: Sacred and Profane is a surprise treat from an unlikely concert attraction."

Track listing

Personnel
 Terri Nunn - vocals, producer (tracks 1–12), mixing (tracks 13–15), art direction
 Scott Peets - engineer (tracks 1–12)
 Jay Baumgardner - mixing (tracks 1–12)
 Meeks - producer and mixing (tracks 13–15)
 Jamie Dunlap - co-producer, engineer and mixing (tracks 13–15)
 Gilby Clarke - vocal engineering (tracks 13–15)
 Tom Baker - mastering
 Jolie Clemens - art direction, front cover photography
 Ron W. Burch, Suzy Ligon - live photography

References

2000 live albums
Berlin (band) albums
Time Bomb Recordings live albums